Setesdølen is a Norwegian newspaper, issued in the municipality of Bygland, and covering the valley of Setesdal.

External links
Setesdølen (in Norwegian)

Newspapers published in Norway